Laura Hostetler is a professor in the Department of History in the University of Illinois at Chicago, Illinois, the United States. The principal research interests of Laura Hostetler are the history of cartography, empire, and encounters between Europe and Asia. She belongs to the school of thought known as the New Qing History. Her book, Qing Colonial Enterprise: Ethnography and Cartography in Early Modern China, demonstrates how the Qing dynasty pursued its imperial ambitions by using cartography and ethnography.

In 1995 she received her Ph.D. in the Department of Asian and Middle Eastern Studies at University of Pennsylvania, where she studied with Susan Naquin.

Publications 
Qing Colonial Enterprise: Ethnography and Cartography in Early Modern China, University of Chicago Press, 2001.
The Art of Ethnography: A Miao Album of Guizhou Province, University of Washington Press, 2005.

References 

American sinologists
Historians of China
21st-century American historians
University of Illinois faculty
University of Pennsylvania alumni
Living people
Year of birth missing (living people)